The Kubr or Kubrya (Кубря) is a river in the Yaroslavl Oblast of Russia. It rises in the Lyakhovo marshes and flows into the Nerl, a right tributary of the Volga. The township of Kubrinsk takes its name from the river.

References 

Rivers of Yaroslavl Oblast